The Mohammed VI Bridge (Arabic: جسر محمد السادس) is a cable-stayed bridge that spans the valley of the Bouregreg River near Rabat in Morocco. It is named after the current king of Morocco.

The bridge is characterised by its architecture comprising two 200-meters high arched towers, which symbolize the new doors to the cities of Rabat and Salé. The deck is supported by two sets of 20 pairs of parallel multi-strand stay cables.

The structure forms part of the new 41.5 km Rabat motorway bypass around the city of Rabat and will improve traffic congestion in Hay Riad, the capital's western residential suburb.

See also
Rabat Ring Road
List of highest bridges in the world
List of tallest bridges in the world

References

Buildings and structures in Rabat
Cable-stayed bridges
Bridges completed in 2016
Bridges in Morocco
21st-century architecture in Morocco